The 2016 UEFA European Football Championship, commonly referred to as UEFA Euro 2016 (stylised as UEFA EURO 2016) or simply Euro 2016, was the 15th UEFA European Championship, the quadrennial international men's football championship of Europe organised by UEFA. It was held in France from 10 June to 10 July 2016. Spain were the two-time defending champions, having won the 2008 and 2012 tournaments, but were eliminated in the round of 16 by Italy. Portugal won the tournament for the first time, following a 1–0 victory after extra time over the host team, France, in the final played at the Stade de France.

For the first time, the European Championship final tournament was contested by 24 teams, having been expanded from the 16-team format used since 1996. Under the new format, the finalists contested a group stage consisting of six groups of four teams, followed by a knockout phase including three rounds and the final. Nineteen teams – the top two from each of the nine qualifying groups and the best third-placed team – joined France in the final tournament, who qualified automatically as host; a series of two-legged play-off ties between the remaining third-placed teams in November 2015 decided the last four finalist spots.

France was chosen as the host nation on 28 May 2010, after a bidding process in which they beat Italy and Turkey for the right to host the 2016 finals. The matches were played in ten stadiums in ten cities: Bordeaux, Lens, Lille Métropole, Décines-Charpieu, Marseille, Nice, Paris, Saint-Denis, Saint-Étienne, and Toulouse. It was the third time that France hosted the finals, after the inaugural tournament in 1960 and the 1984 finals.

As the winners, Portugal earned the right to compete at the 2017 FIFA Confederations Cup in Russia.

Bid process

Four bids came before the deadline on 9 March 2009. France, Italy and Turkey put in single bids while Norway and Sweden put in a joint bid. Norway and Sweden eventually withdrew their bid in December 2009.

The host was selected on 28 May 2010.

 Round 1: Each of the thirteen members of the UEFA Executive Committee ranked the 3 bids first, second, and third. First place ranking received 5 points, second place 2 points, and third place 1 point. Executive members from the countries bidding were not allowed to vote.
 Round 2: The same thirteen-member committee voted for either of the two finalists.

Qualification

The qualifying draw took place at the Palais des Congrès Acropolis in Nice, on 23 February 2014, with the first matches being played in September 2014.

53 teams competed for 23 places in the final tournament to join France, who automatically qualified as hosts. Gibraltar competed in a European Championship qualifying for the first time since their affiliation to UEFA in 2013. The seeding pots were formed on the basis of the UEFA national team coefficients, with the Euro 2012 champions Spain and hosts France automatically top seeded.

The 53 national sides were drawn into eight groups of six teams and one group of five teams. The group winners, runners-up, and the best third-placed team (with the results against the sixth-placed team discarded) qualify directly for the final tournament. The remaining eight third-placed teams contested two-legged play-offs to determine the last four qualifiers.

In March 2012, Gianni Infantino, the UEFA general secretary at the time, stated that UEFA would review the qualification competition to ensure that it was not "boring". In September 2011, during UEFA's first full strategy meeting, Michel Platini proposed a qualification format involving two group stages, but the member associations did not accept the proposal. In May 2013, Platini confirmed a similar qualifying format would be again discussed during the September 2013 UEFA executive committee meeting in Dubrovnik.

Qualified teams
Thirteen of the sixteen teams (including hosts France) that qualified for Euro 2012 qualified again for the 2016 final tournament. Among them were England, who became only the sixth team to record a flawless qualifying campaign (10 wins in 10 matches), defending European champions Spain, and world champions Germany, who qualified for their 12th straight European Championship finals.

Romania, Turkey, Austria and Switzerland all returned after missing out in 2012, with the Austrians qualifying for just their second final Euro tournament, after having co-hosted Euro 2008. Returning to the final tournament after long absences were Belgium for the first time since co-hosting Euro 2000, and Hungary for the first time in 44 years, having last appeared at Euro 1972, and 30 years since appearing in a major tournament, their previous one being the 1986 FIFA World Cup.

Five teams secured their first qualification to a UEFA European Championship final tournament: Albania, Iceland, Northern Ireland, Slovakia and Wales. Northern Ireland, Slovakia and Wales had each previously competed in the FIFA World Cup, while Albania and Iceland had never participated in a major tournament. Similarly, both Austria and Ukraine completed successful qualification campaigns for the first time, having only previously qualified as hosts (of 2008 and 2012 respectively).

Scotland were the only team from the British Isles not to qualify for the finals, and it also marked the first time that both Northern Ireland and the Republic of Ireland qualified for the same major tournament finals. Greece, champions in 2004, finished bottom in their group and failed to qualify for the first time since 2000. Two other previous champions, the Netherlands (1988) and Denmark (1992), missed out on the finals. The Dutch team failed to qualify for the first time since Euro 1984 (also held in France), missing out on their first major tournament since the 2002 FIFA World Cup and only 16 months after having finished third at the 2014 FIFA World Cup. Denmark did not appear at the Euro finals for the first time since 2008, after losing in the play-off round against Sweden.

Final draw
The draw for the finals took place at the Palais des Congrès de la Porte Maillot in Paris on 12 December 2015, 18:00 CET. The 24 qualified teams were drawn into six groups of four teams, with the hosts France being automatically placed in position A1. The remaining teams were seeded into four pots of five (Pot 1) or six teams (Pots 2, 3 and 4). As the title holders, Spain were seeded in Pot 1, while the other 22 teams were seeded according to the UEFA national team coefficients updated after the completion of the qualifying group stage (excluding the play-offs), which were released by UEFA on 14 October 2015.

Teams were drawn consecutively into Group A to F. First, the Pot 1 teams were assigned to the first positions of their groups, while next the positions of all other teams were drawn separately from Pot 4 to 2 (for the purposes of determining the match schedules in each group).

The draw resulted in the following groups:

Venues
Ten stadiums were used for the competition. Initially, twelve stadiums were presented for the French bid, chosen on 28 May 2010. These venues were to be whittled down to nine by the end of May 2011, but it was suggested in June 2011 that eleven venues might be used. The French Football Federation had to choose which nine would actually be used.

The choice for the first seven was undisputed – the national Stade de France, four newly constructed ones in Lille Metropole (Villeneuve-d'Ascq), Décines-Charpieu (Lyon Metropolis), Nice and Bordeaux, and two stadiums in the two largest cities, Paris and Marseille. After Strasbourg opted out for financial reasons following relegation, two more venues were selected to be Lens and Nancy, leaving Saint-Étienne and Toulouse as reserve options.

In June 2011, the number of host venues was increased to eleven due to the new tournament format featuring 24 teams, instead of the previous 16. The decision meant that the reserve cities of Toulouse and Saint-Étienne joined the list of hosts. Then, in December 2011, Nancy announced its withdrawal from the tournament, after plans for the stadium's renovation were cancelled, finalising the list of host venues at ten.

Two other possible options, the Stade de la Beaujoire in Nantes and the Stade de la Mosson in Montpellier (venues which were used for the 1998 World Cup) were not chosen. The final list was confirmed by the UEFA Executive Committee on 25 January 2013. Capacity figures are those for matches at UEFA Euro 2016 and are not necessarily the total capacity that the venues are capable of holding.

Team base camps
Each team had a "team base camp" for its stay between the matches. The teams trained and resided in these locations throughout the tournament, travelling to games staged away from their bases. From an initial list of 66 bases, the 24 participating teams had to confirm their selection with UEFA by 31 January 2016.

The selected team base camps were announced on 2 March 2016:

Finals format
To accommodate the expansion from a 16-team finals tournament to 24 teams, the format was changed from that used in 2012 with the addition of two extra groups in the group stage, and an extra round in the knockout phases. The six groups (A to F) still contained four teams each, with the top two from each group still going through to the knockout phase. In the new format, however, the four best third-ranked sides also progress, leaving 16 teams going into the new round-of-16 knockout phases, ahead of the usual quarter-finals, semi-finals and final, and only 8 teams going out at the group stage. The format is exactly the one that was applied to the 1986, 1990, and 1994 FIFA World Cups, except for the absence of a third place play-off.

This format generates a total of 51 matches, compared with 31 matches for the previous 16-team tournament, to be played over a period of 31 days. UEFA's general secretary Gianni Infantino previously described the format as "not ideal" due to the need for third-ranked teams in the group stage advancing, leading to difficulty in preventing situations where teams might be able to know in advance what results they need to progress out of the group, leading to a lack of suspense for fans, or even the prospect of mutually beneficial collusion between teams.

Squads

Each national team had to submit a squad of 23 players, three of whom must be goalkeepers, at least ten days before the opening match of the tournament. If a player became injured or ill severely enough to prevent his participation in the tournament before his team's first match, he would be replaced by another player.

Match officials
On 15 December 2015, UEFA named eighteen referees for Euro 2016. The full referee teams were announced on 1 March 2016. England was the only country to have two referees in the tournament.

Hungarian referee Viktor Kassai was chosen to officiate the opener between France and Romania. English referee Mark Clattenburg was chosen to officiate the final between Portugal and France.

Two match officials, who serve only as fourth officials, and two reserve assistant referees were also named:

Opening ceremony

An hour before the first match at the Stade de France on 10 June 2016, 20:00 CEST, the opening ceremony of the tournament was held. The ceremony featuring 600 dancers, 150 of which were involved in a traditional French dance before an uptempo version of "La Vie en rose" by French singer Édith Piaf was played. Following this, French DJ David Guetta took to the stage, he performed shortened versions of some of his hits before he was joined on stage by Swedish singer Zara Larsson to perform the official song of the tournament "This One's for You".

The ceremony ended with a fly over from the Patrouille Acrobatique de France of the French Air Force, trailing the French blue, white, and red. The ceremony also featured a tribute to the victims of the November 2015 Paris attacks. Following the ceremony, the hosts France beat Romania 2-1 in the opening game of the tournament.

Group stage

UEFA announced the tournament schedule on 25 April 2014, which was confirmed on 12 December 2015, after the final draw.

Group winners, runners-up, and the best four third-placed teams advanced to the Round of 16.

All times are local, CEST (UTC+2).

Tiebreakers
If two or more teams were equal on points on completion of the group matches, the following tie-breaking criteria would be applied:
 Higher number of points obtained in the matches played between the teams in question;
 Superior goal difference resulting from the matches played between the teams in question;
 Higher number of goals scored in the matches played between the teams in question;
 If, after having applied criteria 1 to 3, teams still had an equal ranking (e.g. if criteria 1 to 3 were applied to three teams that were level on points initially and these criteria separated one team from the other two who still have an equal ranking), criteria 1 to 3 would be reapplied exclusively to the matches between the teams who were still level to determine their final rankings. If this procedure did not lead to a decision, criteria 5 to 9 would apply;
 Superior goal difference in all group matches;
 Higher number of goals scored in all group matches;
 If only two teams had the same number of points, and they were tied according to criteria 1–6 after having met in the last round of the group stage, their ranking would be determined by a penalty shoot-out. (This criterion would not be used if more than two teams had the same number of points.);
 Fair play conduct (1 point for a single yellow card, 3 points for a red card as a consequence of two yellow cards, 3 points for a direct red card);
 Position in the UEFA national team coefficient ranking system.

Group A

Group B

Group C

Group D

Group E

Group F

Ranking of third-placed teams

Knockout phase

In the knockout phase, extra time and a penalty shoot-out were used to decide the winner if necessary.

As with every tournament since UEFA Euro 1984, there was no third place play-off.

All times are local, CEST (UTC+2).

Bracket

Round of 16

Quarter-finals

Semi-finals

Final

Statistics

Goals

Awards

UEFA Team of the Tournament
The UEFA Technical Team was given the objective of naming a team of eleven players during the tournament, a change from the 23-man squads in the past competitions. The group of analysts watched every game before making the decision following the final. Four players from the winning Portuguese squad were named in the tournament.

Player of the Tournament
The Player of the Tournament award was given to Antoine Griezmann, who was chosen by UEFA's technical observers, led by UEFA chief technical officer Ioan Lupescu and including Sir Alex Ferguson and Alain Giresse.
 Antoine Griezmann

Young Player of the Tournament
The Young Player of the Tournament award, open to players born on or after 1 January 1994, was given to Renato Sanches who was named above Kingsley Coman and Portugal teammate Raphaël Guerreiro. The particular player, who deserved the award, was also chosen by UEFA's technical observers.
 Renato Sanches – 

Golden Boot
The Golden Boot was awarded to Antoine Griezmann, who scored one goal in the group stage and five in the knockout phase.
 Antoine Griezmann – 6 goals, 2 assists (555 minutes)

Silver Boot
The Silver Boot was awarded to Cristiano Ronaldo, who scored two goals in the group stage and one in the knockout phase, as well as providing three assists.
 Cristiano Ronaldo – 3 goals, 3 assists (625 minutes)

Bronze Boot
The Bronze Boot was awarded to Olivier Giroud, who scored one goal in the group stage and two in the knockout phase, as well as providing two assists; compatriot Dimitri Payet amassed the same tally, but played 50 more minutes than Giroud.
 Olivier Giroud – 3 goals, 2 assists (456 minutes)

Goal of the Tournament
The Goal of the Tournament was decided by online voting. A total 5 goals were in the shortlist. On 13 July 2016, after an open vote with over 150,000 entries, UEFA announced that Hungarian midfielder Zoltán Gera's goal against Portugal had been named as fans' goal of the tournament. In a separate poll, UEFA's technical observers decided that Swiss winger Xherdan Shaqiri's goal against Poland deserved top spot in their list of the ten best goals of the tournament.
Fans:  Zoltán Gera (vs Portugal)
Technical observers:  Xherdan Shaqiri (vs Poland)

Prize money

A total of €301 million was distributed to the 24 teams contesting in the tournament, a growth from the €196 million payment in the preceding event. Each team was rewarded €8 million, with further rewards depending on their performances. Portugal, the champions of the competition, were awarded €8 million in addition to any prize money earned in earlier rounds – the biggest prize attainable was €27 million (for winning all group matches and the final).

Full list:

Prize for participating: €8 million

Extra payment based on team's performance:

Champions: €8 million
Runners-up: €5 million
Reaching the semi-finals: €4 million
Reaching the quarter-finals: €2.5 million
Reaching the round of 16: €1.5 million
Winning a group match: €1 million
Drawing a group match: €500,000

Discipline
A player was automatically suspended for the next match for the following offences:
 Receiving a red card (red card suspensions could be extended for serious offences)
 Receiving two yellow cards in two different matches; yellow cards expired after the completion of the quarter-finals (yellow card suspensions were not carried forward to any other future international matches)
The following suspensions were served during the tournament:

Issues
Pre-tournament concerns included heavy flooding of the River Seine in Paris, and strikes in the transport sector shortly before the beginning of the event.

Security
Following the attacks on Paris on 13 November 2015, including one in which the intended target was a game at the Stade de France, controversies about the safety of players and tourists during the upcoming tournament arose. Noël Le Graët, president of the French Football Federation, explained that the concern for security had increased following the attacks. He claimed: "there was already a concern for the Euros, now it's obviously a lot higher. We will continue to do everything we can so that security is assured despite all the risks that this entails. I know that everyone is vigilant. Obviously, this means that we will now be even more vigilant. But it's a permanent concern for the federation and the [French] state".

A "suspicious vehicle" near the Stade de France was destroyed by a police-mandated controlled explosion on 3 July, hours before the venue held the quarter-final between France and Iceland.

Hooliganism

The day before the tournament, fighting broke out between local youths and England fans in Marseille; police dispersed the local youths with tear gas. On 10 June, English fans at Marseille clashed with police. Six English fans were later arrested and sentenced to prison. On 11 June, violent clashes erupted in the streets of the same city before and after the Group B match between England and Russia that ended in a 1–1 draw. One English fan was reported to be critically ill in the hospital while dozens of others were injured in the clashes. On 14 June, the Russian team were given a suspended disqualification, fined €150,000, and warned that future violence would result in their removal from the cup. Additionally, 50 Russian fans were deported. The English team was also warned about disqualification, but was not formally charged. Violence between English and Russian fans arose again in Lille, where a total of 36 fans were arrested, and 16 people were hospitalised.

Late in the Group D match between the Czech Republic and Croatia, flares were thrown onto the pitch from where Croatia supporters were massed. The match was paused for several minutes while they were cleared up. There was also fighting in the Croatia supporters' area. Later that same day, there was violence involving Turkish fans after Turkey's defeat by Spain. As a result of these incidents and earlier crowd troubles after the countries' first matches, UEFA launched official procedures against the Croatian and Turkish football federations. The Croatian federation was fined €100,000 for the incidents.

Pitch quality
The football pitches at French stadiums were criticised during the group stage for their poor quality. France coach Didier Deschamps was especially critical. UEFA tournament director Martin Kallen blamed heavy rain for damaged turf, though the press speculated that non-football events may have also been a contributor.

The pitch at Lille received particular attention with players slipping continuously and with groundsmen forced at halftime to try to repair the cut up pitch. Despite UEFA applying numerous methods to rectify the problems, such as a ban on pre-match training on the pitch, use of fertilisers, seeding, mowing, light therapy, drying and playing with the roof closed to avoid rain, it was decided that the pitch at Lille had to be entirely replaced following the Italy–Republic of Ireland group match on 22 June. The new pitch was replaced with Dutch grass and was ready before the last sixteen match between Germany and Slovakia on 26 June. UEFA also stated that repair work was also required at the St Denis and Marseille pitches. This was the second time that a Euro championship pitch needed to be re-laid mid-tournament. The first time was the St. Jakob-Park in Basel during Euro 2008.

UEFA's Leeds-based consultant Richard Hayden had come under criticism as it was reported he ordered local groundsmen to re-lay three pitches (Lille, Nice, and Marseille) with Slovak grass, provided by an Austrian company for an estimated €600,000 (£460,000). On 22 June it was reported that France's grass association officials had blamed Hayden for continued problems with the pitches, citing "it is amazing that it is only these pitches that have problems today". The Austrian manufacture of the turf, Richter, responded to the French grass association officials by saying "the turf for the stadiums in Lille and Marseille was delivered in top condition" and that "the turf placement and further care were handled by French companies and no one other than the French grounds-people had control over the grounds condition". In a statement, UEFA rejected the criticism against Hayden as baseless and stated they were satisfied with his work.

Moths
Before the final match started, the stadium was invaded by Silver Y moths, which caused some irritation to the players, staff and coaches. The reason this occurred is because the workers at the stadium left the lights switched on the day before the match which attracted huge swaths of insects. The players and coaches of each team during the warm-up tried swatting the moths, and ground staff used brushes to clean moths from the walls, ground and other places. One moth was infamously captured flying on and around Cristiano Ronaldo's face when he was sitting on the pitch after being injured during the match.

Marketing

Video game
The UEFA Euro 2016 video game was released by Konami as a free DLC on Pro Evolution Soccer 2016. The DLC was available for existing Pro Evolution Soccer 2016 members on 24 March 2016 for major platforms (PlayStation 3, PlayStation 4, Xbox 360, Xbox One and Microsoft Windows). The game was released physically and digitally on 21 April for PlayStation 3 and PlayStation 4 users.

Logo and slogan
The official logo was unveiled on 26 June 2013, during a ceremony at the Pavillon Cambon Capucines in Paris. Conceived by Portuguese agency Brandia Central, which also created the visual identity for the previous European Championship, the design is based on the theme "Celebrating the art of football". The logo depicts the Henri Delaunay Trophy with the blue, white and red colours of the French flag, surrounded by a mixture of shapes and lines representing different artistic movements and football elements.

On 17 October 2013, UEFA announced the official slogan of the tournament: Le Rendez-Vous. Asked about its meaning, Jacques Lambert, chairman of the Euro 2016 organising committee, told that the slogan "is much more than a reminder of dates (...) and venues". He further explained that "UEFA is sending out an invitation to football fans throughout the world and to lovers of major events, an invitation to meet up and share the emotions of an elite-level tournament".

Match balls

For the first time in the tournament's history, two official match balls were used. The Adidas Beau Jeu, used for the group stage, was unveiled on 12 November 2015 by former France player Zinedine Zidane. During the tournament, the Adidas Fracas was introduced as the exclusive match ball for the knockout rounds.

Mascot
The official mascot of the tournament, Super Victor, was unveiled on 18 November 2014. He is a child superhero in the kit of the France national football team, with a red cape at the back, to echo the colours of the flag of France. The cape, boots and ball are claimed to be the child's superpowers. The mascot first appeared during the match between France and Sweden at the Stade Vélodrome, Marseille on 18 November 2014. The name of the mascot was revealed on 30 November 2014 after receiving about 50,000 votes from the public on the official UEFA website, beating the other nominated names of "Driblou" and "Goalix". It is based on the idea of victory and references the boy's super powers that he gained when he found the magic cape, boots and ball.

The name of the mascot is the same as the name of a sex toy. UEFA said that this 'coincidence' was not their responsibility because the name was selected by fan voting.

Official songs
The competition's official opening song was "This One's for You" by David Guetta featuring Zara Larsson, and the official closing song was "Free Your Mind" by Maya Lavelle. It was reported that David Guetta sought one million fans to add their voices to the official anthem via a website.

Sponsorship

Broadcasting

The International Broadcast Centre (IBC) is located at the Paris expo Porte de Versailles in Paris' 15th arrondissement.

References

External links

 UEFA Euro 2016 at UEFA.com
 Official Technical Report

 
2016
Euro 2016
2015–16 in French football
2016
June 2016 sports events in France
July 2016 sports events in France